Henry Ludvig Larsen (16 August 1891 – 20 January 1969) was a Norwegian rower who competed in the 1912 Summer Olympics and in the 1920 Summer Olympics.

In 1912 he was the bowman of the Norwegian boat, which was eliminated in the semi-finals of the coxed four event. In some sources the crew members of this boat are also listed as bronze medalists. Eight years later he won the bronze medal with the Norwegian boat.

References

External links
profile

1891 births
1969 deaths
Norwegian male rowers
Olympic rowers of Norway
Rowers at the 1912 Summer Olympics
Rowers at the 1920 Summer Olympics
Olympic bronze medalists for Norway
Olympic medalists in rowing
Medalists at the 1920 Summer Olympics